Rudina is a village and municipality in Kysucké Nové Mesto District in the Zilina Region of northern Slovakia.

History
In historical records the village was first mentioned in 1359.

Geography
The municipality lies at an altitude of 387 metres and covers an area of 6.272 km². It has a population of about 1,710 people.

References

External links
http://www.statistics.sk/mosmis/eng/run.html DEAD LINK

Villages and municipalities in Kysucké Nové Mesto District